In enzymology, a poly(glycerol-phosphate) alpha-glucosyltransferase is an enzyme that catalyzes the chemical reaction

UDP-glucose + poly(glycerol phosphate)  UDP + O-(alpha-D-glucosyl)poly(glycerol phosphate)

Thus, the two substrates of this enzyme are UDP-glucose and poly(glycerol phosphate), whereas its two products are UDP and O-(alpha-D-glucosyl)poly(glycerol phosphate).

This enzyme belongs to the family of glycosyltransferases, specifically the hexosyltransferases.  The systematic name of this enzyme class is UDP-glucose:poly(glycerol-phosphate) alpha-D-glucosyltransferase. Other names in common use include UDP glucose-poly(glycerol-phosphate) alpha-glucosyltransferase, uridine diphosphoglucose-poly(glycerol-phosphate), and alpha-glucosyltransferase.

References

 

EC 2.4.1
Enzymes of unknown structure